Occella kasawae is a fish in the family Agonidae. It was described by David Starr Jordan and Carl Leavitt Hubbs, originally in the genus Iburiella. It is a marine, temperate water-dwelling fish which is known from the northwestern Pacific Ocean, including the southern Okhotsk Sea and Hokkaido, Japan. It dwells at a depth range of 12–140 metres.

References

kasawae
Fish described in 1925